Calliotropis antarctica is a species of sea snail, a marine gastropod mollusk in the family Eucyclidae.

Description
The size of the shell varies between 8 mm and 10.5 mm.

Distribution
This species occurs in Antarctic waters.

References

 Dell, R. K. (1990). Antarctic Mollusca with special reference to the fauna of the Ross Sea. Bulletin of the Royal Society of New Zealand, Wellington 27: 1–311
 Engl W. (2012) Shells of Antarctica. Hackenheim: Conchbooks. 402 pp.

antarctica
Gastropods described in 1990